Karrys is a surname.  Notable people with the surname include:

 Byron Karrys (1926–1981), Canadian football player
 George Karrys (born 1967), Canadian curler and journalist
 Steve Karrys (1924–1997), Canadian football player

Lists of people by surname